Richard Krajicek and Jan Siemerink were the defending champions, but none competed this year.

Paul Haarhuis and Mark Koevermans won the title by defeating Mårten Renström and Mikael Tillström 6–7, 6–1, 6–4 in the final.

Seeds

Draw

Draw

References

External links
 Official results archive (ATP)
 Official results archive (ITF)

Doubles